NCIS (Naval Criminal Investigative Service) is a media franchise of American television programs originally created by Donald P. Bellisario and currently broadcast on CBS, all of which deal with military related criminal investigations based on the Naval Criminal Investigative Service of the United States Department of the Navy, which includes the United States Navy and the United States Marine Corps.

In 2003, NCIS was introduced via a backdoor pilot, from the TV show JAG with NCIS in turn spinning off NCIS: Los Angeles, NCIS: New Orleans, and NCIS: Hawaiʻi in 2009, 2014, and 2021 respectively. NCIS: Los Angeles had a proposed spin-off, but it was not picked up by CBS.

 The main NCIS series is the longest-running show of the franchise, which premiered its twentieth season on September 19, 2022.

Overview
NCIS, voted America's favorite television series in 2011, finished its tenth season as the most-watched television series in the U.S. during 2012–13 U.S. network television season; and is broadcast in over 200 territories worldwide. As of the end of the 2014–15 U.S. network television season, NCIS remains TV's most watched drama series. Spin-off NCIS: New Orleans ended its first season as the second most watched drama on CBS, and the fifth most watched series on TV. NCIS: Los Angeles ended its fifth season as the fourth most watched series on TV, and the second most watched drama.

NCIS

NCIS first aired September 23, 2003, and episodes continue to be produced, with the 20th season premiering September 19, 2022. The series follows the work of the Major Case Response Team, stationed in Washington, D.C. Supervised by Special Agent Leroy Jethro Gibbs, a former Marine Gunnery Sergeant, and a thrice-divorced widower. The team specializes in crime scene examination, and the investigation of murders. Gibbs' team has included Caitlin Todd, who earned her stripes protecting the President as a member of the Secret Service; Anthony DiNozzo, a former Baltimore detective; Timothy McGee, a computer specialist and M.I.T. graduate; Jessica Knight, a former REACT agent recruited following the death of her team; Eleanor Bishop, a former NSA security analyst and threat assessment specialist; Nicholas Torres, an undercover operative; Alexandra Quinn, a training officer who supervised the recruitment of Bishop and Torres; Ziva David, a former Mossad assassin; and Dr Jack Sloane, a no-nonsense senior agent and trained operational psychologist. Primarily dealing with cases along the East Coast, and acting under the supervision of successive NCIS Directors Jenny Shepard and Leon Vance, the team is supported by Abigail Sciuto, a forensic specialist; Kasie Hines, a forensic scientist; Jimmy Palmer, an Assistant Medical Examiner turned Chief Medical Examiner; Donald "Ducky" Mallard, a seasoned Chief Medical Examiner and now NCIS Historian; Clayton Reeves, an MI-6 officer assigned to liaise with NCIS from the SIS; and Alden Parker, a wizened FBI special agent.

NCIS: Los Angeles

The characters for NCIS: Los Angeles were introduced via backdoor pilot in the 2009 two-part NCIS episode "Legend". NCIS: Los Angeles premiered on September 22, 2009, and the series continued into its 12th season on November 8, 2020. The series focuses on The Office of Special Projects, an elite counter-terrorist division of NCIS, and is responsible for threats pertaining to national security, as well as high-profile murders and cases that require undercover work. Under the supervision of Operations Manager Hetty Lange, a master of disguise and prop-artisan, OSP is led by G. Callen, a street kid turned special agent with a desire to find out who he is. Callen works alongside Kensi Blye, a forensic specialist and the daughter of a Marine; Dominic Vail, an M.I.T. graduate and a computer-whiz; Marty Deeks, a former LAPD detective and lawyer recruited to serve as liaison to OSP and now a NCIS Special Agent; Nell Jones, an intelligence analyst with the highest IQ at NCIS; Eric Beale, an awkward technician and the second half of the technical dream-team; Nate Getz, a deep-cover operative and Operational Psychologist seconded to Hetty's team; Sam Hanna, a former SEAL and a family man who met his wife on the job; Fatima Namazi, a cryptologist technician, Devin Roundtree, an ex–FBI agent recruited to NCIS by Sam and Callen, laconic Assistant Director Owen Granger, executive assistant director for Pacific operations (EAD-PAC) Shay Mosley, who serves as the team's operational supervisor, and Deputy Director Louis Ochoa, the team's temporary supervisor.

NCIS: Red

In November 2012, CBS commissioned a pilot episode for a potential NCIS: Los Angeles spinoff titled NCIS: Red. Written and produced by Shane Brennan, the series would follow "a mobile team of agents who live and work together as they go across the country to solve crimes". On February 6, 2013, John Corbett was cast as retired special agent Roy, the series male lead. Earlier, Miguel Ferrer would join the cast as a series regular, and reprising his NCIS: Los Angeles role, Edwin Hodge had been cast as Kai, an intelligence analyst, Scott Grimes was cast as Dave, Gillian Alexy was cast as Claire, and Kim Raver was cast in the pilot, playing the lead role of Paris. The pilot episode, titled "Red" and "Red-2", aired on March 19 and March 26, 2013, during the fourth season of NCIS: Los Angeles. On May 15, 2013, CBS announced that the pilot would not be taken to series. On May 21, 2013, CBS President Nina Tassler stated that "sometimes [spinoffs] work and sometimes they don't. Protecting [the franchise] was really important." CBS was reportedly "open to redeveloping the pilot with a new cast attached", though a second franchise appearance by Scott Grimes in 2017 remains the only continuation of Red to date.

NCIS: New Orleans

As with Los Angeles, NCIS: New Orleans was introduced via backdoor pilot in the 2014 two-part NCIS main-series episode "Crescent City," while the series itself premiered on September 23, 2014 and ended with its seventh and final season on May 23, 2021. The New Orleans NCIS team is headed by Special Agent Dwayne Cassius Pride, a seasoned operative known as "King" to his friends. He's a former Sheriff's Deputy with the second highest arrest record in the history of Jefferson Parish Sheriffs Office. Tasked with heading a small satellite squad who handle Naval and Marine related cases in New Orleans, through Mississippi and Alabama to the Texas panhandle, Pride supervises Christopher LaSalle, an agent recruited from the New Orleans Police Department's Vice Division, who is well known for his volunteer work at the children's hospital; Meredith Brody, a senior career agent who earned her stripes afloat, and later became the youngest agent in the history of NCIS Midwest; Sonja Percy, a former undercover ATF agent who joined the team to come in from the dark and later departed to join the FBI; former FBI agent Tammy Gregorio, recruited to the team after heading an investigation into their ethics and operations following Agent Brody's controversial departure; Sebastian Lund, a former lab technician who joined NCIS as a forensics agent before transitioning fully to the field; Hannah Khoury, a multilingual investigative specialist who serves as the team's Assistant Supervisory Special Agent and Quentin Carter, a NCIS Special Agent assigned to the team to replace Agent LaSalle following his murder. Together, the team are assisted by Loretta Wade, a Jefferson Parish coroner and Patton Plame, an NCIS computer specialist.

NCIS: Hawaiʻi 

On February 16, 2021, it was reported that a potential spin-off set in Hawaii is in the works from NCIS: New Orleans executive producers Christopher Silber and Jan Nash. On April 23, 2021, it was announced that CBS had given the production a straight-to-series order to the spin-off, and reportedly intended to include the franchise's first female lead character. The series centers on the work of the NCIS Pearl Harbor office led by Special Agent Jane Tennant, a hard-charging agent who is the first female Special Agent in Charge of the Pearl Harbor office. She leads an elite team of agents which includes Jesse Boon, her second in command and is an expert Interrogator; Lucy, a junior but eager agent; Ernie Malik, the team's technical analyst and Kai, a charming NCIS agent and native Hawaiian.  Also with Kate Whistler, an ambitious DIA agent.  Together they handle crimes involving the Military and National security on the Island.

NCIS: Sydney

On February 16, 2022, Paramount announced that a spin-off set in Sydney, Australia had been ordered by Network 10 and Paramount+; Shane Brennan has been announced as the showrunner for the spin-off, which will be the first set outside of the United States.

Series
Each series, except NCIS: Hawaiʻi was spun off via a two-part episode from an established series, serving in effect as a backdoor pilot.

Main cast

Notes

Crossovers
This is a complete list of all crossovers, both within the franchise and out of it. All characters, main, recurring, and shared guest stars, are credited.

Within the NCIS franchise

Outside the NCIS franchise

Notes

Universe

The NCIS franchise, born of JAG, shares a television universe with Scorpion (via a direct crossover with Los Angeles), First Monday (via an indirect crossover with JAG), Hawaii Five-0 (via a direct crossover with Los Angeles), MacGyver and Magnum P.I. (via crossovers with Hawaii Five-0), and JAG itself (via crossovers with NCIS and Los Angeles).

Theme songs

Games

NCIS: Hidden Crimes
On September 15, 2016, Ubisoft launched a hidden-object mobile game titled NCIS: Hidden Crimes. Developed by Ubisoft Abu Dhabi (who also worked on CSI: Hidden Crimes) in conjunction with CBS Interactive, the game was released for Android & iOS devices.

NCIS TV movies

In the UK, certain NCIS multi-part episodes were edited together to make a combined feature and shown on Channel 5, 5USA, CBS Action and Fox UK. These include:

See Also
CSI (franchise)
Criminal Minds (franchise)

References

 
Mass media franchises introduced in 2003
Television franchises
Paramount Global franchises